Pretzschendorf is a village and a former municipality in the Sächsische Schweiz-Osterzgebirge district, in Saxony, Germany. Since 31 December 2012, it is part of the municipality Klingenberg.

References 

Former municipalities in Saxony
Klingenberg, Saxony